The Paxton Water Tower and Pump House are a historic water tower and pump house located at 145 S. Market St. in Paxton, Illinois.

The buildings were built in 1887 to provide a steady water supply to Paxton. Prior to their construction, Paxton had considerable difficulty with its water supply; a fire which destroyed much of the city's downtown in 1870 had been exacerbated by the fire department's low water supply, and an artesian well project started in 1872 was unsuccessful. The new water tower and pump house were the first in a series of infrastructure improvements which spurred the economic development of Paxton. The two buildings were built with brick. There used to be a water tank on top of the pump house tower which was missing in latest years.

The buildings were added to the National Register of Historic Places in 1984. It is one of four sites on the National Register in Paxton and one of five in Ford County.

See also 
 Beloit water tower: NRHP-listed octagonal water tower in Wisconsin

References

External links

Water towers in Illinois
Industrial buildings and structures on the National Register of Historic Places in Illinois
Water supply pumping stations on the National Register of Historic Places
National Register of Historic Places in Ford County, Illinois
Historic American Buildings Survey in Illinois
Infrastructure completed in 1887
Towers completed in 1887
Water towers on the National Register of Historic Places in Illinois
Fairbanks-Morse
Octagonal buildings in the United States